Pseudoblabes is a genus of moths in the subfamily Arctiinae first described by Philipp Christoph Zeller in 1853.

Description
Palpi slight and porrect (extending forward). Antennae of male ciliated. Tibia with long spurs. Forewings broad and costa highly arched. Vein 3 arise from close to angle of cell, vein 5 absent. Vein 6 from below upper angle. Vein 7 to 9 stalked and vein 10 absent. Hindwings of male possess a patch of modified scales on the costal vein. Apex excised and veins 3 and 5 absent. Female also absent vein 3. Vein 5 from above angle of cell. Veins 6 and 7 stalked, and vein 8 from middle of cell which is closed. Forewings with a large costal fold in male and small in female.

Species
Pseudoblabes oophora Zeller, 1853
Pseudoblabes pseudoblabia (Hampson, 1918)

References

Cisthenina
Moth genera